After Having Spent a Night Among Horses is a 1998 poetry collection by Finnish poet Tua Forsström. It won the Nordic Council's Literature Prize in 1998.

References

1998 poetry books
Finnish poetry collections
Nordic Council's Literature Prize-winning works